The North American Basketball League (NABL) is an American minor professional basketball league organization founded in 2016.

History 
Formed in 2016, the NABL began with 10 teams based in the South and Southwest regions of the United States. The first regular season games were played on April 30, 2016. Atlanta Show defeated Music City Kings in the first-ever league game 113-78. Atlanta Show would go undefeated on their way to capture the first league championship in August by defeating the Dallas Hoyas 145-110 in the championship game.

Season two saw expansion to a national level with 19 teams competing. Four teams from the Northwest were added including the Vancouver-based SB Battle. The San Antonio Lions became the second league champion by defeating the defending champ Atlanta Show 103-82 in the championship.

In the third season the league would again see 19 member teams, this time with a different footprint. Northwest division was eliminated and replaced by expansion in the Midwest with a six-team division and three teams in the Northeast. Dallas Mustangs (previously known as Dallas Hoyas) won the championship defeating Chautauqua Hurricane 112-105.

Teams

Former teams

Alamo City Aztecs (2017)
Atlanta Show (2016–2017)
Austin Knights (2016)
Buffalo Blue Hawks (2019)
Capital Cardinals (2017)
Charleston Panthers (2019)
Chautauqua Hurricane (2018–2019)
Dallas Diesel (2018)
Dallas Mustangs (2016–2018)
DFW United (2016–2017)
DuBois Dream (2018–2019)
Florida GymRats (2018)
Grand Rapids Danger (2018–2019)
Huntsville Force (2017)
Indianapolis Diesels (2018)
Jamestown Jackals (2018)
Kitsap Admirals (2017)
Kentucky Enforcers (2019)  
Lancaster Thunder (2019)
Miss-Lou Warriors (2016–2018)
Motor City Chargers (2018)
Music City Kings (2016–2017, 2019)
Ohio Bootleggers (2018)
Panama City Piranhas (2017)
Quad City Flames (2017)
RDC Vulcans (2017)
San Antonio Lions (2016–2018)
Savannah Cavaliers (2016)
SB Battle (2017)
Shreveport-Bossier Flight (2016)
Southern Illinois Pharaohs (2017–2018)
Tacoma Thunder (2017)
Tampa Bay Hawks (2018)
Texas Toros (2018)
Texas Wolverines (2017)

Champions

Awards

References

External links
Official website

Basketball leagues in the United States
Professional sports leagues in the United States
Sports leagues established in 2016
2016 establishments in the United States